Myrciaria racemosa is a species of plant in the family Myrtaceae. It is endemic to Ecuador and was first described in 2011. It is a tree that grow to between 18 and 28 meters high, with yellowish-white flowers. It is named after its unusual racemose inflorescence.

References

racemosa
Crops originating from the Americas
Tropical fruit
Flora of South America
Fruits originating in South America
Cauliflory
Fruit trees
Berries
Plants described in 2011
Endemic flora of Ecuador